Millennium Stars is a 2000 Indian Malayalam-language drama film directed by Jayaraj, starring Jayaram and Suresh Gopi in lead roles, and also features Biju Menon and Abhirami. The soundtrack of the film was composed by Vidyasagar. The movie was also the first Malayalam movie to be released in this millennium. Biju Menon won the Asianet Film Award for Best Supporting Actor for this film. Later dubbed into Tamil and released as Sivasankar.

Plot 

When they were children, Shiva and Shankar went to Mumbai in search of a living. Circumstances puts them in jail, where they meet a bully named Karunan. They escape from jail. Several years later, Shankar and Shiva dream of becoming singers. Karunan is still active as a criminal. Through their hard work, the Shiva-Shankar duo become successful singers and start being called "millennium stars". Then the villain enters and tries to separate the two. Karunan convinces them not to separate.

Cast
Jayaram as Shankar
Suresh Gopi as Karunan
Biju Menon as Shivan
Abhirami as Radha
Suja Raghuram
Harisree Asokan
Devan
Kalabhavan Mani  
Manorama
Laxmi Rattan
Jagathy Sreekumar

Box office 
This film was released with huge expectations but was a box office failure as the producer lost .

Soundtrack

The film's music was composed by Vidyasagar, with Malayalam lyrics by Gireesh Puthenchery, Hindi lyrics by Tahir Faraz and English lyrics by Recardo Barrantes. Though the film failed at the box-office, the soundtrack is considered as one of Vidyasagar's career bests.

References

External links
 

2000s Malayalam-language films
2000s musical films
2000 films
Films scored by Vidyasagar
Indian musical films
Films shot in Mumbai